Angelo Pedroni (22 April 1914 – 24 June 1992) was a prelate of the Catholic Church who worked in the diplomatic service of the Holy See, with the title of nuncio from 1965 until his retirement in 1989 and the rank of archbishop from 1965 until his death.

Biography
Angelo Pedroni was born in Maccagno, Varese, Italy, on 22 April 1914. He earned his licenciate in theology at the Pontifical Gregorian University. He was ordained a priest on 13 March 1937 and served as parish priest at Saints Nabor and Felix in Milan for five years. He received his doctorate in jurisprudence in 1942 and a doctorate in canon law from the Pontifical Gregorian University in 1944. To prepare for a diplomatic career he entered the Pontifical Ecclesiastical Academy in 1945. His assignments in the diplomatic service of the Holy See included Cairo until 1951; a stint in Paris in 1952–3 as secretary to the nuncio, Angelo Roncalli, the future Pope John XXIII; Rome as secretary to the committee for the Marian year 1954 followed by a few years at the Secretariat of State. On 4 November 1960, he was named Permanent Observer of the Holy See to UNESCO (Paris).

On 7 April 1965, Pope Paul VI appointed him Titular Archbishop of Novica and Apostolic Delegate to Thailand, Laos, and the Malacca Peninsula. He received his episcopal consecration from Cardinal Giovanni Colombo in the Basilica of Sant'Ambrogio in Milan on 22 May.

In 1967, Pedroni worked in the Secretariat of State in Rome. On 19 July 1969, Pope Paul appointed him Apostolic Nuncio to Costa Rica. On 15 March 1975 Pope Paul named him Apostolic Pro-Nuncio to Syria.

On 6 July 1983, Pope John Paul II appointed him Apostolic Nuncio to Belgium, Luxembourg, and the European Community.

On 13 June 1989, Pope John Paul accepted his resignation which he had submitted for reasons of age after turning 75.

Writings

Notes

References
 

Additional sources
 Catholic Hierarchy: Archbishop Angelo Pedroni 

Apostolic Nuncios to Belgium
Apostolic Nuncios to Costa Rica
Apostolic Nuncios to Syria
Apostolic Nuncios to Thailand
Apostolic Nuncios to the European Union
Permanent Observers of the Holy See to the United Nations
People from the Province of Varese
1914 births
1992 deaths